Harris and Company is an American television drama series that aired on NBC from March 15 to April 5, 1979, on Thursday night.

Synopsis
The series stars Bernie Casey as Mike Harris, a working-class African-American father of five who relocates his family from Detroit, Michigan, to Los Angeles, California, after the death of his wife. The series is based upon Love Is Not Enough, a TV movie that aired on NBC on June 12, 1978. It was the first weekly American TV drama series centered on an African-American family.

The series aired for only four episodes and was the lowest-rated U.S. broadcast network primetime series that season, ranking 114th with a 7.6/12 rating/share.

Cast
 Bernie Casey as Mike Harris
 David Hubbard as David Harris
 Renee Brown as Liz Harris
 Lia Jackson as  Juanita "J.P." Harris
 Dain Turner as Richard Harris
 Eddie Singleton as Tommy Harris
 Stu Gilliam as Charlie Adams
 Carol Tillery Banks as Angie Adams
 Lois Walden as Louise Foreman
 James Luisi as Harry Foreman

References

Sources

External links
 

1979 American television series debuts
1979 American television series endings
NBC original programming
Television shows set in Los Angeles
1970s American drama television series
Television series by Universal Television
English-language television shows